is a former Japanese football player and manager.

Playing career
Kato was born in Tokyo on July 27, 1964. After graduating from high school, he joined Yomiuri (later Verdy Kawasaki) in 1983. Although he played many matches in the late 1980s, he could not become a regular player at the club which had many Japan national team players. In 1995, he moved to Japan Football League club Fukuoka Blux. He retired end of 1995 season.

Coaching career
In 2009, Kato became a general manager for Regional Leagues club Matsumoto Yamaga FC. The club was promoted to Japan Football League end of 2009 season. In June 2011, manager Hideo Yoshizawa was sacked and Kato became new manager as Yoshizawa successor. The club finished the 4th place in 2011 and won the Qualify to promoted to J2 League. However Kato did not have license for J.League manager, he resigned as manager and returned to general manager.

Club statistics

References

External links

Matsumoto Yamaga FC

1964 births
Living people
Association football people from Tokyo
Japanese footballers
Japan Soccer League players
J1 League players
Japan Football League (1992–1998) players
Tokyo Verdy players
Avispa Fukuoka players
Japanese football managers
Matsumoto Yamaga FC managers
Association football midfielders
Association football defenders